Azucena is a 2000 Filipino drama film directed by Carlos Siguion-Reyna. The film stars Ricky Davao, Glydel Mercado, Dante Rivero and Alessandra de Rossi on her theatrical debut. This also marks Anjanette Abayari's final theatrical appearance, albeit on a special participation role.

Plot
Lily (Alessandra) lives with her father Tomas (Ricky) and stepmother (Glydel). Her parents sell Lily's aging dog, whom she calls her best friend, to Teban (Dante) for dog meat and asocena. Lily, however, convinces Teban to return her dog and then begins a friendship with him. This causes the ire of her friends and family. Teban becomes her surrogate father, who supports her for her needs.

Cast
 Ricky Davao as Tomas
 Glydel Mercado as Sonia
 Dante Rivero as Teban
 Alessandra de Rossi as Lily
 Anjanette Abayari as Lily's Mother
 Tony Mabesa as Tomas' Boss
 Romy Romulo as Mario
 Mon Confiado as Policeman
 Allen Dizon as Policeman
 Richard Joson as Policeman
 Crispin Pineda as Policeman
 Dennis Marasigan as Bar Manager
 Idda Yaneza as Panciteria Owner
 Richard Arellano as Panciteria Owner's Son
 Sherry Lara as School Principal
 Minnie Aguilar as Mrs. Duran
 Carlo Cannu as Nico
 Anna Cathrina Lalin as Lea
 Noreen Agua as Shirley
 Gigi Locsin as Sonia's Friend
 Olga Natividad as Sonia's Friend
 Madeleine Nicolas as Lily's Godmother
 Danny Labra as Dodong
 Jojit Lorenzo as Boy
 Bernard Palanca as Dog Seller
 Debbie Ignacio as Lily Lookalike
 Christian Apilado as Timothy
 Amily Cesista as Jeepney Passenger
 Louie Domingo as Jeepney Passenger
 Rose Gacula as Bather

Awards

References

External links

2000 films
Filipino-language films
Philippine drama films
Maverick Films films
Films directed by Carlos Siguion-Reyna